The state of North Dakota held a series of elections on November 6, 2012. In addition to selecting presidential electors, North Dakotan voters selected one of its two United States Senators and its lone United States Representative, as well as seven statewide executive officers and one Supreme Court Justice. Primary elections were held on June 12, 2012.

United States President and Vice President 

North Dakota voters chose three electors to represent them in the Electoral College via a popular vote. Voters selected the Republican challengers, former Massachusetts Governor Mitt Romney and Congressman Paul Ryan, over the Democratic incumbent President Barack Obama and Vice President Joe Biden.

United States Senator 

Voters selected a senator to replace the retiring incumbent, Kent Conrad of the Democratic-NPL. Former Democratic-NPL Attorney General Heidi Heitkamp defeated U.S. Representative Rick Berg in a close race.

United States House of Representatives 

Voters selected a representative to the United States House of Representatives to replace incumbent Republican Rick Berg, who instead ran for the Senate. Republican Public Service Commissioner Kevin Cramer defeated former Democratic-NPL state representative Pam Gulleson.

Governor 

In the gubernatorial election, Republican incumbent Governor Jack Dalrymple, who had succeeded to the office when then-Governor John Hoeven resigned, won election to a first full term with his running mate, incumbent Lieutenant Governor Drew Wrigley.

State Auditor 
In the election for State Auditor, voters selected Republican incumbent Bob Peterson over Democratic-NPL state representative Scot Kelsh.

State Treasurer 
In the State Treasurer election, Republican incumbent Kelly Schmidt defeated the Democratic-NPL challenger, accountant Ross Mushik.

Insurance Commissioner 
In the race for Insurance Commissioner, voters selected Republican incumbent Adam Hamm over the Democratic-NPL challenger Tom Potter.

Public Service Commissioner 
Voters were given the opportunity to fill one of the three seats on the Public Service Commission, selecting Republican Randy Christmann over Democratic-NPL and Libertarian party candidates.

Superintendent of Public Instruction 
In the nonpartisan election for Superintendent of Public Instruction, voters awarded the position to Kirsten Baesler, who had been endorsed by the Republican Party, instead of Tracy Potter, who had been endorsed by the Democratic-NPL party.

Justice of the Supreme Court 
In the nonpartisan election for Justice of the North Dakota Supreme Court, Judge Daniel Crothers ran unopposed.

References

 
North Dakota